Roy "Chubby" Carrier is an American zydeco musician.  He is the leader of Chubby Carrier and the Bayou Swamp Band.

Biography 
Carrier's father and grandfather both played zydeco music, and his cousins recorded under the name The Carrier Brothers. He was taught to play accordion by his father,  Roy Carrier Sr., and played with his father's band at age 12, first on accordion and then on drums. By age 17, he played drums with Terrance Simien from 1986 until 1989, then formed a group of his own with his brothers Troy and Kevin.

Carrier's third album, 1993's Dance All Night, was his biggest success.

Carrier has made guest appearances on albums by Tab Benoit – Live: Swampland Jam, Doug Kershaw – Cajun Sweet Home Louisiana, Calvin Owens – Stop Lying in My Face and Jimmy Thackery – Switching Gears.

Carrier's 2010 release Zydeco Junkie won the Grammy in the category Best Zydeco or Cajun Music Album.

Personal life 
Carrier is Catholic.

Discography
Go Zydeco Go (Jewel Records, 1989)
Boogie Woogie Zydeco (Flying Fish Records, 1991)
Dance All Night (Blind Pig Records, 1993)
Who Stole the Hot Sauce? (Blind Pig Records, 1996)
Too Hot to Handle (Louisiana Red Hot Records, 1999)
It's Party Time (Right Click Records, 1999)
Take Me to the Zydeco (Swampadelic Records, 2001)
Ain't No Party Like a Chubby Party (Swampadelic Records, 2005)
Bayou Road (Swampadelic Records, 2006)
Live at Knuckleheads, Kansas City (Swampadelic Records, 2007)
Zydeco Junkie (Swampadelic Records, 2010)
Zydeco Stuff (Swampadelic Records, 2015)

See also
Chubby Carrier and the Bayou Swamp Band

References

Zydeco accordionists
Living people
1967 births
21st-century accordionists
Blind Pig Records artists
Flying Fish Records artists
African-American Catholics